MD Mazharul Islam  is a Bangladeshi professional footballer who plays as a  goalkeeper. He last played for Chittagong Abahani in Bangladesh Premier League, he is currently a free agent.

Career
Himel started his football journey while still a student of the Azim Uddin High School in Kishoreganj. Azim Uddin High School won Kishoreganj, Mymensingh and Dhaka divisional school football championships during Himel's tenure as the goalkeeper there. Himel brought victory to the Kishoreganj district football team through a tiebreaker in Bhaluka, Mymensingh for the Kishoreganj district team. Himel caught the attention of the coach of the Bangladesh national football team after seeing his performance during that game. Himel was consistently present in the U-14, U-17, U-19 and U-23 national football teams, and as a result, in 2006, he was called to the Bangladesh national football team.

While playing in the under-17 Bangladesh national football team, Himel first joined Badda Jagarani and then Dhanmondi Club, which is now known as Sheikh Jamal Dhanmondi Club. Later joined Mohammedan SC directly from Dhanmondi Club, 2005. In his first season at the club he won the 2005–06 National Football Championship. He went on to play for Abahani Limited Dhaka and Arambagh KS the following years. In November 2019, Himel was named Mohammedan SC's captain for the season.

Himel, returned to the national team under head coach Jamie Day, the same year he captained Mohammedan.

Personal life
Himel's father Jinnatul Islam was a renowned sports organizer. Himel has three brothers and three sisters.

References

Living people
1988 births
Bangladeshi footballers
Bangladesh international footballers
Sheikh Jamal Dhanmondi Club players
People from Kishoreganj District
Association football goalkeepers
Footballers at the 2006 Asian Games
Footballers at the 2010 Asian Games
Asian Games competitors for Bangladesh